Drycothaea guadeloupensis is a species of beetle in the family Cerambycidae. It was described by Fleutiaux and Sallé in 1889. It is known from Dominica and Guadalupe.

References

Calliini
Beetles described in 1889